Ramona is a 1946 Mexican drama film directed by Víctor Urruchúa and starring Esther Fernandez. It is an adaptation of the 1884 American novel Ramona by Helen Hunt Jackson. The film was both a financial and critical failure. The film's sets were designed by the art director Luis Moya.

Plot summary

Cast
 Antonio Badú 
 Juan Calvo 
 Esther Fernandez 
 Rafael Icardo 
 Cuquita Martinez 
 Carlos Navarro 
 Bernardo Sancristóbal 
 Fanny Schiller

References

Bibliography 
 Ilan Stavans (ed.) Border Culture. ABC-CLIO, 2010.

External links 
 

1946 films
1946 drama films
Mexican drama films
1940s Spanish-language films
Films directed by Víctor Urruchúa
Films based on American novels
Mexican black-and-white films
Films scored by Manuel Esperón
Films based on Ramona by Helen Hunt Jackson
1940s Mexican films